Lieutenant-Commander Sir Harry Warden Stanley Chilcott,  (11 March 1871 – 8 March 1942), also known as Warden Chilcott, was Conservative MP for Liverpool Walton.

During the First World War, he served with the Royal Naval Air Service in France. A flamboyant self-made businessman and sportsman, he was elected with the backing of the Coalition government in 1918, was returned unopposed in 1922 and 1923, was elected again in 1924, and stood down in 1929. He was knighted in 1922.

Chilcott was a close friend of both Foreign Secretary Sir Austen Chamberlain and Ivy Chamberlain, the couple's "infatuation" with Chilcott which was "inexplicable to almost everyone". He arranged for Chamberlain to meet foreign statesmen on his yacht Dolphin, including Benito Mussolini, whom both admired. Their relationship was severed in 1935, after Chilcott behaved badly toward the Queen of Spain when Chilcott and the Chamberlains were holidaying in Corsica.

Sources
British Parliamentary Election Results 1918-1949, FWS Craig

Further reading
P. J. Waller, Democracy and Sectarianism: A Political and Social History of Liverpool, 1868–1939 (Liverpool University Press, 1981)

External links 

 

Conservative Party (UK) MPs for English constituencies
Members of the Parliament of the United Kingdom for Liverpool constituencies
Knights Bachelor
English justices of the peace
Deputy Lieutenants of Hampshire
20th-century British businesspeople
British hunters
Royal Naval Air Service personnel of World War I